Intimate Power is a 1986 Canadian thriller film.

Plot 
A government ministry's fast-rising head of security asks a shadowy figure, Meursault, to steal a bag from an armoured truck. Meursault goes to Théo, a former night club owner, in prison for two years on false charges, who is being released in exchange for information about Montreal's underworld. Théo agrees to steal the bag for money and safe passage to the United States for himself and his son Robin. Théo brings in two helpers, Gilder, ex-con and set designer, and Roxanne, Gilder's friend, a tough-minded petty thief. Their elaborate plan blows up when a guard, Martial, takes his responsibilities too seriously.

Recognition 
 1986
 Genie Award for Best Achievement in Art Direction/Production Design - Michel Proulx - Nominated
 Genie Award for Best Achievement in Costume Design - Louise Jobin - Nominated
 Genie Award for Best Achievement in Direction  - Yves Simoneau - Nominated
 Genie Award for Best Achievement in Editing - André Corriveau - Nominated
 Genie Award for Best Motion Picture - Claude Bonin - Nominated
 Genie Award for Best Performance by an Actor in a Supporting Role - Robert Gravel - Nominated
 Genie Award for Best Performance by an Actress in a Leading Role - Marie Tifo - Nominated
 Genie Award for Best Original Screenplay - Yves Simoneau, Pierre Curzi - Nominated
 Genie Award for Best Achievement in Sound Editing - Andy Malcolm, Paul Dion, Jules Le Noir - Nominated

External links 
 
 

1986 films
1980s crime thriller films
1980s heist films
Canadian crime thriller films
Films set in Montreal
Films shot in Montreal
Canadian heist films
Neo-noir
French-language Canadian films
1980s Canadian films